This is a list of cricketers who have played first-class, List A or Twenty20 cricket matches for the South Western Districts cricket team in domestic South African men's cricket competitions.

South Western Districts have competed in top-level South African domestic first-class and List A cricket competitions since 2006 and in top-level Twenty20 competitions since 2011, although a team called South-West Districts played in a single first-class match in the 1904–05 Currie Cup competition. The modern team is based at Oudtshoorn in the Western Cape region of South Africa and uses Recreation Ground, Oudtshoorn as its home ground.

Teams with the names South-West Districts and South Western Districts played occasional matches at levels below the top-level of domestic competition from the 1888–89 season. Players who appeared only for those teams are not included in the list. Many players on this list will have appeared for other teams, but only those who played for South Western Districts sides or the South-West Districts team in top-level competitions have been included here.

A

B

C
Blayde Capell
Kirwin Christoffels
Martin Coetzee
Murray Commins

D

E
Denovan Ekstraal
Sybrand Engelbrecht
Grant Esau
Errin Ewerts

F
Phaphama Fojela
Bardo Fransman
Richardt Frenz

G
Siviwe Gidana
Bronwell Goeda
Stephanus Grobler

H

J
Christiaan Jonker
Justin Jordaan

K
Tyrese Karelse
Simon Khomari
Jongile Kilani
Hanno Kotze

L
Waldo Lategan
George Linde
Brendon Louw

M

N
Sithembiso Ndwandwa
Tshepiso Ndwandwa
Ntabyozuke Nobebe
Onke Nyaku

O
Jonathan October
Yamkela Oliphant
Andre Olivier

P

R

S

T
Stefan Tait

V

W
Todd Walker
Sean Whitehead
Reece Williams
Sydwill Williams

Notes

References

Cricket in South Africa
South Western Districts